This is a list of satellite and digital television channels in Telugu language (spoken primarily in the Indian states of Andhra Pradesh and Telangana) broadcasting at least throughout the Telugu states and in India.

State Owned Channels

General Entertainment

Defunct

Movies

Defunct

Music

Comedy

Kids

Telugu Audio feed
Cartoon Network
Discovery Channel
Discovery Kids
Disney Junior
ETV Bala Bharat
Hungama TV
Marvel HQ
Nickelodeon
Nick Jr.
Nickelodeon Sonic
Pogo
Sony Yay

Defunct

Sports

Lifestyle and Infotainment

Telugu Audio Feeds

Note:This channels available in  Telugu audio feeds

Discovery Channel
History TV18
National Geographic
Nat Geo Wild
Sony BBC Earth

Defunct

Religious

Non-Genre

News

Defunct

High Definition (HD) channels

Note: HD channels are added with Dolby Atmos audio system.

General Entertainment

Movies

Music

Sports

Telugu Audio Feeds
Cartoon network HD+
Discovery HD
History TV 18 HD
National Geographic HD
Nat Geo Wild HD
Nick HD+
Sony BBC Earth HD
Sony Pix HD
Sony Ten 4 HD
&flix HD

Digital Channels
Colors Telugu
Liv Telugu
Tollywood
Zee News Telugu

See also
List of 4K channels in India
List of HD channels in India
List of Tamil language television channels
List of Malayalam-language television channels
List of Kannada language television channels

References

 
Lists of television channels by language
Lists of television channels in India